Through much of the 19th century, Pace's Ferry was an important ferry across the Chattahoochee River near Atlanta.  Started in the early 1830s near Peachtree Creek, it was run by Hardy Pace, one of the city's founders.  It was an important transportation link to northwestern Georgia, especially prior to the construction of the State Road (the Western & Atlantic Railroad) to Chattanooga.

In Vinings (formerly Paces), Pace's Mill was a gristmill begun by Hardy Pace, founded to diversify his holdings after the railroad was built.  The short Paces Mill Road still exists today.  Just across the river is Paces, the northwesternmost neighborhood of Atlanta.

During the Atlanta Campaign of the American Civil War, the Battle of Pace's Ferry was fought July 5, 1864.

Paces Ferry Road
The original Pace's Ferry Road was begun during the Georgia Gold Rush as a stage coach bringing people from Decatur to Vinings, where they could continue on to gold country. The road went southeast from the river to Irbyville (later Irby, now Buckhead), then following what is now called "Old Decatur Road", then Cheshire Bridge Road, through what is now Emory University on Clifton Road, along Haygood Drive then North Decatur Road until that hits Clairmont Road, which was then known as the Shallowford Road. 

In modern times, Paces Ferry Road (dropping the apostrophe) is still an important east–west route across northern Atlanta.  West Paces Ferry Road runs from the center of Buckhead Village as far west as a dead-end in Paces, while Paces Ferry Road splits off to the northwest at Nancy Creek and runs across the river to Vinings in Cobb County, where it is the address for the world headquarters of The Home Depot.  Beginning at Atlanta Road and going east, it crosses I-285 at mile 18, and heads into historic Vinings where it crosses the Chattahoochee River. This river crossing is very near the old ferry location, just down from the 1904 bridge that replaced the ferry.  That first wooden bridge had been used for pedestrians since being replaced by a concrete one in the early 1970s.

At the river, Paces Ferry Road enters Fulton County and the Atlanta city limits and continues to its terminus at the western end of Atlanta's Buckhead area. Here, West Paces Ferry Road continues under I-75 at mile 255, and heads east through some of Atlanta's oldest and wealthiest Buckhead neighborhoods.  It serves as the address of the Georgia Governor's Mansion as well many of Atlanta's other stately older mansions and estates.  Unlike many of metro Atlanta's newer suburbs, the area along this street has maintained most of its forest cover, also making it a pleasant and scenic drive.  It emerges from this canopy at the center of Buckhead, meeting Peachtree Road at the southern end of Roswell Road.

After passing Georgia 9 and U.S. 19 (both routed on Peachtree to the south and Roswell to the north), it becomes East Paces Ferry Road.  It stops at Piedmont Road (Georgia 237), then continues very slightly northward on the other side as a residential street.  The tolled section of the Georgia 400 expressway, finished in 1993, made this a dead-end road in the early 1990s.  It resumes on the other side of the tollway, along the southeastern edge of Lenox Square, the city's first indoor shopping mall.  The road then ends east-northeast of Lenox Road at Roxboro Road.

See also
Historic ferries of the Atlanta area.

External links
Tuxedo Park homes along the road

Ferries of Atlanta
Historic American Engineering Record in Georgia (U.S. state)
Transportation in Fulton County, Georgia
Transportation in Cobb County, Georgia